Ola Hassis, born 22 March 1951, is a Swedish former cross-country skier, competing for Orsa IF at club level. He won Vasaloppet in 1979. He's the brother of Swedish cross-country skier Bengt Hassis.

References 

1951 births
Living people
Swedish male cross-country skiers
Vasaloppet winners